Dr James Taylor MA (Hons), FRSA (born 1963) is a British author, expert on maritime art, and former curator of the National Maritime Museum, Greenwich, east London.

Biography 
A school trip in the 1970s to Captain James Cook’s Birthplace Museum started a lifelong interest in maritime art and history for James Taylor.

Taylor was educated at the Universities of St Andrews and Manchester. Early in his career, Taylor spent time as an auctioneer with Phillips Fine Art Auctioneers, where he was the Victorian paintings specialist. From 1989, he was a curator of paintings, drawings and prints, exhibition organiser and Corporate Membership Manager at the National Maritime Museum, Greenwich.  He began to publish on marine art in the mid 1990s.

Taylor has since written several books, including illustrated histories on maritime and yachting art, and, in 2008, 'The Voyage of the Beagle', charting the story of the ship made famous by Charles Darwin.  In March 2009, Dr John Van Wyhe wrote in BBC History Magazine, that 'The Voyage of the Beagle' ‘brings together a wonderful mixture of old and new illustrations and information about the voyage from wildly scattered sources.’  He has also produced a study on the popular English 20th century cartoonist and Punch magazine editor, Fougasse, who created the anti-rumour and gossip posters during World War II. His publication Your Country Needs You - The Secret History of the Propaganda Poster (Saraband, August 2013) was timed to coincide with the start of the World War I commemorations in 2014. Dazzle - Disguise & Disruption in War & Art and Pack Up Your Troubles - How Humorous Postcards Helped to Win World War One were published in September and October 2016 by The Pool of London Press and Bloomsbury respectively.

Taylor guest-curated the exhibition 'Dazzle - Disguise and Disruption in War and Art' at the St Barbe Museum & Art Gallery in Lymington (16 June -23 September 2018) that included loans from private and public collections including: the British Museum, Imperial War Museum, National Maritime Museum, Greenwich, Russell-Cotes, Southampton City Art Gallery, Tate Britain and the V & A. Also, co-organised the Dazzle study day at the University of Southampton on 30 June 2018. See: https://www.southampton.ac.uk/greatwar_unknownwar/news/events/2018/06/30-dazzle-study-day.page

Awards and recognition
Among Taylor’s professional achievements are several Sir James Caird Awards for writing, and the Sir Geoffrey Callender Award for outstanding achievement in supporting the public lecture programme and developing the corporate membership scheme of the National Maritime Museum.  Since 1999, he has worked as a freelance writer and lecturer.  In 2001, he was appointed an official lecturer for the National Association of Decorative and Fine Arts Societies (NADFAS), now renamed The Arts Society. According to the Mere Literary Festival, Taylor ‘lectures regularly to a wide range of societies, including NADFAS [The Arts Society] around the world.’ https://theartssociety.org/about-us

In June 2015 Taylor was awarded a PhD from the University of Sussex for his thesis on William Westall (1781-1850) the 'landscape and figure draughtsman' who sailed with Matthew Flinders on the voyage of HMS Investigator (1801-3) – the first recorded circumnavigation of Australia.

His publication The Voyage of the Beagle... was short-listed for the Mountbatten Maritime Prize in 2016.

Taylor is a Fellow of the Royal Society of Arts.

Bibliography 
 Marine Painting: Images of Sail, Sea and Shore, Studio Editions (1995). .
 Yachts On Canvas: A Pictorial History of Yachting, Conway Maritime Press (1998). .
 Yachts On Canvas: Artists’ Images of Yachts from the Seventeenth Century to the Present Day, Conway Maritime Press (2005). .
 Rule Britannia!: Art, Royalty, and Power in the Age of Jamestown, with Richard Ormond, Virginia Museum of Fine Arts (2008). .
 The Voyage of the Beagle: Darwin’s Extraordinary Adventure in Fitzroy’s Famous Survey Ship, Conway Publishing (2008). .
 Careless Talk Costs Lives: Fougasse and The Art of Public Information, Conway Publishing (2010). .
 Your Country Needs You - The Secret History of the Propaganda Poster, Saraband (2013). .
 Pack Up Your Troubles - How Humorous Postcards Helped to Win World War One, Bloomsbury (2016). .
 Dazzle - Disguise and Disruption in War and Art, Pool of London Press (2016). .
 Picturing the Pacific - Joseph Banks and the shipboard artists of Cook and Flinders, Bloomsbury (2018). .

References

1963 births
Living people
Alumni of the University of St Andrews
Alumni of the University of Manchester
Alumni of the University of Sussex
British curators
British maritime historians
British art historians
British auctioneers